Artamanovo is a rural locality (a settlement) in Porozhnensky Selsoviet, Shipunovsky District, Altai Krai, Russia. The population was 122 as of 2013. There are 2 streets.

Geography 
Artamanovo is located 41 km WNW of Shipunovo (the district's administrative centre) by road. Porozhneye is the nearest rural locality.

References 

Rural localities in Shipunovsky District